El abigeo is a 2001 Peruvian crime drama film written, directed, produced and co-starred by Flaviano Quispe in his directorial debut. Starring Percy Pacco, Fernando Pacori Maman and Flaviano Quispe. It is based on Ushanan Jampi, one of the "Andean Tales" by Enrique López Albújar.

Synopsis 
José Maylli, grandson of an old peasant woman, commits the crime of cattle theft three times. This fact is taken as an affront by the community members who proceed to capture the cattle raider, torture him and mass hit, finally they sentence him to leave and not return. Never, on pain of death. However, once in the city, Maylli, plunged in sadness, does not resign himself to the expulsion, two forces attract him to his land: his grandmother and her hut, so he decides to continue the journey carrying gifts and a firearm. prevention.

Cast 

 Percy Pacco Lima
 Flaviano Quispe
 Fernando Pacori Mamani
 Victoria Ylaquito Zapana
 Ney Torres Humpire
 Nelly Gonzáles
 Yeni Benique Benique

Reception 
The film was seen by 250,000 spectators throughout its run in Peruvian cinemas.

References 

2001 films
2001 crime drama films
2001 independent films
Peruvian crime drama films
2000s Spanish-language films
Quechua-language films
2000s Peruvian films
Films set in Peru
Films shot in Peru
Films about criminals
Films based on novels

2001 directorial debut films